Silver Surfer, also known as Silver Surfer: The Animated Series, is a 13-episode animated television series based on the Marvel Comics superhero Silver Surfer, created by Stan Lee and Jack Kirby. The series aired for one season on the Fox Kids Network in 1998.

Overview
Blending cel-shaded and computer animation, the series is rendered in the style of Silver Surfer creator Jack Kirby.

Inspired by various Silver Surfer comic book stories, the series alters the original mythos in some key ways. It removes the Fantastic Four from The Galactus Trilogy, the foundation for the first three episodes. In this version, the Silver Surfer, who has had the memories of Norrin Radd partially restored to him by Thanos, protects Earth from the hunger of Galactus because it reminds him of Zenn-La.

Many other characters from Marvel's cosmic stable appear in the series, including The Watcher, Ego the Living Planet, Pip the Troll, Drax the Destroyer, and Adam Warlock. Most of the characters featured in the series differ from their printed-page incarnations. For instance, Adam Warlock is an alien supersoldier designed to fight the Kree and, due to Fox broadcast standards, Thanos serves Lady Chaos rather than Death.

The series utilizes a serialized storytelling approach. As with many Silver Surfer comic book stories, episodes tackle a range of social and political issues, including imperialism, slavery, non-violence, and environmental degradation.  The series frequently alludes to the Golden Age of Science Fiction, with two episode titles from novels by Isaac Asimov (Second Foundation and The End of Eternity), one from Joe Haldeman (The Forever War), and character names from Asimov (First Speaker) and Doc Smith (Mentor). The story for one episode was by Harlan Ellison.

The series was canceled after one season. Eight episodes were written for the second season before production was shut down. According to series creator Larry Brody, the cancellation was the result of a legal dispute between Marvel and Saban Entertainment.

Voice cast

Episodes

Home media
In the UK the complete series on two discs were to be released by Liberation Entertainment on July 28, 2008; however, because of the closure of the UK division of Liberation Entertainment, the release was cancelled. The rights were then acquired by Clear Vision LTD who released the set on May 11, 2009.

As with most of the Marvel Films Animation and New World Animation libraries, the rights to this show is currently owned by Disney Enterprises, through BVS Entertainment and Jetix who acquired the Fox Kids Worldwide franchise and the kids’ entertainment programming properties of Saban Entertainment and Fox Children's Productions in 2001 and also, Marvel Animation, which Disney acquired Marvel Entertainment in 2009. However, there are no plans to release the series on Region 1 DVD in its entirety.

In September 2019, it was announced that the complete series would be streaming on Disney+.

References

External links

 Original Airdates and Episode Order
 
 Silver Surfer Episode and Scripts  - Contains scripts for all 13 aired episodes and 8 unproduced episodes.
 DRG4's Silver Surfer: The Animated Series page
 International Catalogue of Superheroes
 Silver Surfer Cartoon Central
 Episode Guide
 Marvel Animation Age Presents: The Silver Surfer

Silver Surfer
1990s American animated television series
1990s American science fiction television series
1990s Canadian animated television series
1990s Canadian science fiction television series
1998 American television series debuts
1998 American television series endings
1998 Canadian television series debuts
1998 Canadian television series endings
American children's animated action television series
American children's animated science fantasy television series
American children's animated space adventure television series
American children's animated superhero television series
Animated series produced by Marvel Studios
Animated television series about extraterrestrial life
Animated television series based on Marvel Comics
Canadian children's animated action television series
Canadian children's animated science fantasy television series
Canadian children's animated space adventure television series
Canadian children's animated superhero television series
English-language television shows
Fox Broadcasting Company original programming
Fox Kids
Television series about alien visitations
Television series by Saban Entertainment
Television series set on fictional planets
Television shows based on Marvel Comics